Acacia neurocarpa is a shrub or tree belonging to the genus Acacia and the subgenus Juliflorae that is endemic to northern Australia.

Description
It has stout and prominently angled branchlets and has silvery sericeous new shoots. Like most species of Acacia it has phyllodes rather than true leaves. It flowers from June to October producing yellow flowers. The simple inflorescences simple are found as cylindrical flower-spikes with a length of  packed with golden coloured flowers. The sub-glabrous, thinly coriaceous to crustaceous seed pods that form after flowering are tightly and irregularly coiled.

Taxonomy
The species was first formally described by the botanist William Jackson Hooker in 1837 as part of the work Icones Plantarum. It was reclassified as Racosperma neurocarpum by Leslie Pedley in 2003 then transferred back to genus Acacia in 2006. Other synonyms are Acacia holosericea var. neurocarpa and Acacia neurocarpa var. neurocarpa.

Distribution
It is native to Kimberley region of Western Australia and has a scattered distribution through the top end of the Northern Territory as far east as Springvale close to the border with Queensland where it is often found along ephemeral watercourses growing in sandy or loamy soils as a part of riparian forest or open woodland communities usually including species of Melaleuca.

See also
List of Acacia species

References

neurocarpa
Acacias of Western Australia
Flora of the Northern Territory
Plants described in 1837
Taxa named by Allan Cunningham (botanist)
Taxa named by William Jackson Hooker